Giulia Perelli  (born 23 April 1982) is an Italian women's international footballer who plays as a defender. She is a member of the Italy women's national football team. She was part of the team at the UEFA Women's Euro 2001 and UEFA Women's Euro 2005.

References

1982 births
Living people
Italian women's footballers
Italy women's international footballers
People from Livorno
Women's association football defenders
ACF Milan players
Torres Calcio Femminile players